An emperor is a type of monarch.

Emperor may also refer to:

Animals
 Emperor angelfish
 Emperor bream
 Emperor penguin
 Emperor moths, moths of the subfamily Saturniinae
 in particular the type genus Saturnia
 Emperor scorpion
 a number of brush-footed butterflies:
in the subfamily Apaturinae:
 Emperors, the genus Apatura
 American emperors, the genus Asterocampa
 a few species in various sister genera of the above:
 Golden emperor, Dilipa morgiana
 Indian purple emperor, Mimathyma ambica
 Sergeant emperor, Mimathyma chevana
 Sordid emperor, two different species: 
 Asterocampa idyja, native to North America
 Chitoria sordida, native to Southeast Asia
 Tawny emperor, two different species: 
 Asterocampa clyton from North America
 Chitoria ulupi from East Asia
 Tytler's emperor, Eulaceura manipuriensis
 White emperor, Helcyra hemina
 The emperor, Morpho peleides
in the subfamily Charaxinae:
some of the butterflies in the genus Charaxes

Media and entertainment
 Emperor (2012 film), a historical drama film directed by Peter Webber
 Emperor (2020 film), a historical drama film directed by Mark Amin
 The Emperor (film), a 1967 short documentary film by George Lucas
 Emperor Entertainment Group of Emperor Group
 Emperor, a novel in the science fiction Isaac Asimov's Robots in Time series by William F. Wu
 Emperor (novel series), a book series by Conn Iggulden
 Emperor (Baxter novel), a novel by Stephen Baxter
 Hol Horse's Stand from JoJo's Bizarre Adventure
 Emperor Palpatine, the main antagonist of the Star Wars franchise

Music
 Emperor Concerto, Beethoven's fifth piano concerto
 Quartet No. 62 in C Major ("Emperor"), Op. 76, No. 3, FHE No. 42, Hoboken No. III:77, a string quartet by Joseph Haydn
 Emperor (band), a Norwegian black metal band
 Emperor (EP), 1993 EP by Emperor
 The Emperors, an American soul band

Games
 Emperor: Battle for Dune, a sci-fi computer game
 Emperor: Rise of the Middle Kingdom, a city-builder computer game
 Emperor of Mankind, a character in the Warhammer 40,000 universe

Transportation
 Emperor, two locomotives in the GWR Iron Duke Class
 Emperor, a locomotive in the South Devon Railway Buffalo class
 Emperor, one of the GWR 3031 Class locomotives that were built for and run on the Great Western Railway between 1891 and 1915

Other uses
 Emperor (grape), an Australian wine grape
 Emperor (roller coaster), an upcoming roller coaster in Sea World San Diego
 The Emperor (Tarot card), a tarot card
 Emperor (typeface), a type face cut by Baltimore Type Foundry
 "Emperor", a disc golf distance driver by Infinite Discs

See also
The Emperor (disambiguation)
:Category:Emperors
Empire (disambiguation)

Animal common name disambiguation pages